Old Town Alexandria is one of the original settlements of the city of Alexandria, Virginia, and is located just minutes from Washington, D.C. Old Town is situated in the eastern and southeastern area of Alexandria along the Potomac River. Old Town is laid out on a grid plan of substantially square blocks.

Etymology
The town was originally called Belhaven, believed to be in honor of a Scottish patriot, John Hamilton, 2nd Lord Belhaven and Stenton, but that name was not accepted with the time, the city was formally named Alexandria in 1779, it was named after Captain Philip Alexander II (1704–1753) and Captain John Alexander (1711–1763), since they donated the land to assist in the development of the area.

History

It was originally laid out in 1749, making it the oldest section of the city, and is a historic district. On July 9, 1790, Congress passed the Residence Act, which approved the creation of a national capital on the Potomac River, formed from land donated by the states of Maryland and Virginia, two pre-existing settlements were included in the territory: the port of Georgetown, Maryland, founded in 1751, and the port city of Alexandria, Virginia, founded in 1749. In the 1830s Alexandria's citizens petitioned Virginia to take back the land it had donated to form the district, through a process known as retrocession. The Virginia General Assembly voted in February 1846 to accept the return of Alexandria. On July 9, 1846, Congress agreed to return all the territory that Virginia had ceded.

Old Town is chiefly known for its historic town houses, art galleries, antique shops, and restaurants as well as its unique cobblestone streets and red brick sidewalks.

Some of the historic landmarks in Old Town include:

 Carlyle House
 Christ Church
 Robert E. Lee's houses: His boyhood home and the Lee-Fendall House.
 Gadsby's Tavern, 
 Stabler-Leadbeater Apothecary Shop, 
 Hollensbury Spite House,
 Shiloh Baptish Church

Other historic buildings are:
 Vowell-Smith House 
 The Torpedo Factory art studio complex
 A replica of George Washington's townhouse

The Washington Metro King Street station opened in 1983, it led to a spurt of new hotel and office building developments in western Old Town, and gentrification of townhouse areas west of Washington Street which were previously an African-American community.

Alexandria Archaeology Museum 
Alexandria Archaeology Museum is an institution dedicated to preserve and study Alexandria, Virginia's archaeological heritage and foster within residents and visitors a connection between the past and present, inspiring a sense of stewardship and adventure. The museum and its laboratory are located on the third floor of the Torpedo Factory Art Center, at 105 N. Union Street in historic Old Town Alexandria, Virginia.

Commerce

Market Square in Old Town is believed to be one of the oldest continuously operating marketplaces in the United States (since 1753), and, during colonial times, was the site of a slave market. Today it contains a large fountain, extensive landscaping, and a farmers' market each Saturday morning. Alexandria City Hall, including the mayor's office, is adjacent to Market Square.

The King street corridor, which starts at the foot of the George Washington Masonic Memorial, and runs directly east until arriving at the west bank of the Potomac River, is where most of Old Town's commercial footprint lies. The street is lined on both sides with stores, restaurants, and bars, many of which are independent establishments.

Transportation
 The Washington Metro King Street station connects Alexandria with other cities in Virginia, Maryland, and Washington, D.C. At the station are located bay stations for all the buses that operate in the city.
 A free trolley bus with information of the historic places through speakers while the passengers ride on it.
 River cruise boats and street entertainers frequent the large plaza at the foot of King Street; the Mount Vernon Trail also passes through.

Media 
The main independent media company in Alexandria is The Zebra, an all good news company that publishes a free monthly paper magazine with local news and events, a website and a youtube TV channel called Z-TV.

Monuments

The George Washington Masonic National Memorial, which was built to honor the first president of the United States and former resident of Alexandria, George Washington, was completed in 1932. The memorial is located on the northern edge of Old Town. Much of Alexandria and parts of Washington, D.C. are viewable from the memorial.

Appomattox is a statue cast by M. Casper Buberl in 1889. It is a statue of a lone Confederate soldier that marked the spot at which Confederate States of America (CSA) units from Alexandria left to join the Confederate Army at the beginning of the American Civil War. The statue stood in the center of the intersection of Washington and Prince streets for 131 years, until June 2, 2020. The United Daughters of the Confederacy, which owns the statue, had the monument removed because vandals had recently damaged other segregation-era statues during nationwide demonstrations.

Events 

In Old Town are celebrated the following events:

 Saint Patrick's Day
 George Washington's Birthday. 
 The Red Cross Waterfront Festival in June.
 The city's birthday celebration with fireworks show in July, and various ethnic heritage days at Tavern Square
 The Scottish Christmas Walk
 The "First Night Alexandria" presents many family-friendly entertainments on New Year's Eve

These parades and other official events are typically led by Alexandria's town crier, who, often dressed in elaborately, by a tradition dating to the 18th century, in a red coat, breeches, black boots and a tricorne hat, welcomes participants.

Scottish Christmas Walk 
A popular Christmas time attraction in Alexandria is the Scottish Christmas Walk, which was established in 1969. The event, which involves a parade through the center of Old Town Alexandria, celebrates the city's Scottish heritage, and is the centerpiece of a yearly holiday festival. It serves as a fundraiser for social services in Alexandria.

See also
Neighborhoods of Alexandria, Virginia

References

 neighborhoods
Alexandria